Stretava is a village and municipality in Michalovce District in the Kosice Region of eastern Slovakia.

History
In historical records the village was first mentioned in 1266.

Geography
The village lies at an altitude of 101 metres and covers an area of 7.748 km2. The municipality has a population of about 635 people.

See also
 List of municipalities and towns in Michalovce District
 List of municipalities and towns in Slovakia

External links
http://www.statistics.sk/mosmis/eng/run.html

Villages and municipalities in Michalovce District